Palaeocixiidae is an extinct family of rock crawlers in the order Grylloblattodea. There is one genus, Palaeocixius, in Palaeocixiidae.

References

Grylloblattodea